The qualifying competition for the 1984 CONCACAF Pre-Olympic Tournament determined the three teams for the final tournament.

North American Zone

First round

Second round

Playoff

Central American Zone

First round

Second round

Caribbean Zone

Preliminary round

Playoff

First round

Second round

Playoff

References

CONCACAF Men's Olympic Qualifying Tournament
1984 in sports